Sodom is an unincorporated community in Logan County, West Virginia, United States.

The locality is outside Sharples. The terrain is hilly and steep, and the elevation of Sodom is 866 feet.

References 

Unincorporated communities in West Virginia
Unincorporated communities in Logan County, West Virginia